Horní Heřmanice is a municipality and village in Třebíč District in the Vysočina Region of the Czech Republic. It has about 100 inhabitants.

References

External links

Villages in Třebíč District